Bani Merje Fawaz (born 9 February 1950) is a Syrian wrestler. He competed in the men's freestyle 74 kg at the 1980 Summer Olympics.

References

1950 births
Living people
Syrian male sport wrestlers
Olympic wrestlers of Syria
Wrestlers at the 1980 Summer Olympics
Place of birth missing (living people)
Wrestlers at the 1978 Asian Games
Asian Games competitors for Syria
20th-century Syrian people